Holy Angels Church may refer to:

Holy Angels Church (Globe, Arizona), listed on the U.S. National Register of Historic Places (NRHP)
Cathedral of the Holy Angels (Gary, Indiana)
Holy Angels Church (Buffalo, New York)
Holy Angels Catholic Church (Sandusky, Ohio), NRHP-listed